Montenegro holds national election for the Parliament and the office of President. Montenegro has a multi-party system with numerous parties. The Parliament has 81 members elected by a system of proportional representation using D'Hondt method for a four-year term. To enter the national parliament, parties have to surpass the electoral threshold of 3%, except for minority lists, for which that threshold does not apply. President is elected at large, with a second round runoff between the two first placed candidates, if no candidate receives an absolute majority in the first round.

Latest elections

2020 Parliamentary election

2018 Presidential elections

See also
 Electoral calendar
 Electoral system

External links
Adam Carr's Election Archive
Parties and Elections in Europe
The Njegoskij Fund Public Project >> Today's Montenegro >> Politics

 

it:Politica del Montenegro